Wales Golf is the national governing body of amateur golf in Wales. It is responsible for administration and enforcement of the handicapping and course rating systems for ladies and men in Wales. Wales Golf organise competitions, including the National Championships in Wales, and select and manage all Welsh amateur golf teams. It also makes, maintains and publishes any necessary rules and regulations.

Wales Golf is based at Catsash, Newport.

References

External links
 Oficial website

Wales
Sports governing bodies in Wales
Golf in Wales
Organisations based in Newport, Wales
Golf associations